The Roman Catholic Archdiocese of Nairobi is the Metropolitan See for the Ecclesiastical province of Nairobi in Kenya, and the Primatial see for Kenya.

History
26 February 1860: Established as Apostolic Prefecture of Zanguebar from the Diocese of Saint-Denis-de-La Réunion in Réunion
23 November 1883: Promoted as Apostolic Vicariate of Zanguebar
1887: Renamed as Apostolic Vicariate of Northern Zanguebar
21 December 1906: Renamed as Apostolic Vicariate of Zanzibar
25 March 1953: Promoted as Metropolitan Archdiocese of Nairobi

Special churches
The seat of the archbishop is a minor basilica, the Cathedral of the Holy Family in Nairobi.

Bishops
 Vicar Apostolic of Northern Zanguebar (Latin Church) 
 Bishop Jean-Marie-Raoul Le Bas de Courmont (27 October 1883 – 27 November 1896)
 Vicars Apostolic of Zanzibar (Latin Church) 
 Bishop Emile-Auguste Allgeyer (17 February 1897 – 3 April 1913)
 Bishop John Gerald Neville (1 September 1913 – 8 March 1930)
 Bishop John Heffernan (15 March 1932 - 7 June 1945)
 Bishop John Joseph McCarthy (11 July 1946 – 25 March 1953); see below
 Metropolitan Archbishops of Nairobi (Latin Church)
 Archbishop John Joseph McCarthy (25 March 1953 – 24 October 1971); see above
 Archbishop Maurice Michael Otunga (24 October 1971 – 14 May 1997) (Cardinal in 1973)
 Archbishop Raphael Ndingi Mwana'a Nzeki (21 April 1997 – 6 October 2007)
 Archbishop John Njue (6 October 2007 – 4 January 2021) (Cardinal in 2007)
 Archbishop  Philip Anyolo (28 October 2021 – present)

Coadjutor Archbishops
Raphael Simon Ndingi Mwana’a Nzeki (1996-1997)
Maurice Michael Otunga (1969-1971); future Cardinal

Auxiliary Bishops
Anthony Ireri Mukobo (1999-2006), appointed Vicar Apostolic of Isiolo
David Kamau Ng’ang’a (1999-)
Alfred Kipkoech Arap Rotich (1996-1997), appointed Bishop of Kenya, Military

Suffragan dioceses
 Kericho
 Kitui
 Machakos
 Nakuru
 Ngong

References

Sources
 GCatholic.org

Nairobi

Religion in Nairobi
Religious organizations established in 1860
1860 establishments in Zanzibar
A